Allen Township, Ohio, may refer to:

Allen Township, Darke County, Ohio
Allen Township, Hancock County, Ohio
Allen Township, Ottawa County, Ohio
Allen Township, Union County, Ohio

Ohio township disambiguation pages